Events from the year 2003 in Belgium

Incumbents
Monarch: Albert II
Prime Minister: Guy Verhofstadt

Events
February
 1 February – Lucas Van Looy consecrated as bishop of Ghent
 15 February – 70,000 people march through the streets of Brussels as part of the global anti-war protest. 

April
 12 April – Wedding of Prince Laurent and Claire Coombs 

May
 15 May – Art deco cinema De Roma in Borgerhout reopens as a cultural centre and performance venue
 18 May – Belgian federal election, 2003

June
 1 June – Same-sex marriage becomes legal in Belgium

July
 12 July – Verhofstadt II Government sworn in

September
 7 September – Guy Harpigny consecrated as bishop of Tournai

October
 1 October – Merger between 3 universities leads to the establishment of the University of Antwerp.

Births

 23 April – Princess Laetitia Maria of Belgium, Archduchess of Austria-Este, fifth child of Prince Lorenz of Belgium, Archduke of Austria-Este and Princess Astrid of Belgium
 20 August – Prince Gabriel of Belgium, second child of Philippe of Belgium (then Duke of Brabant) and Mathilde of Belgium

Deaths

January
 8 January - Franz Drappier comic book writer
 11 January - Bob Maertens  soccer player 
 22 January - Georges Mommerency politician
 29 January - Louis Baret singer and comedian

February
 4 February
Pierre Carteus soccer player
André Noyelle cyclist
 6 February - Mark Braet poet and politician
 9 February - René Uyttendaele mayor
 26 February
Christian Goethals race-car driver
Michel Van Maele mayor

March
 11 March - Jacques Yerna politician
 31 March - Theo Mertens trumpet player

April
 3 April - Karel Boumans comic book writer
 17 April - Jeff Schell molecular biologist
 20 April - Henri Lemaître papal diplomat

May
 15 May
Rik Van Steenbergen cyclist
Marcel Thielemans singer and trombone player
 22 May - Albert Mettens soccer player

June
 1 June - André Lootens mayor
 26 June - Gerard Gaudaen wood carver

July
 18 July - Daniël Van Avermaet TV presenter

August
 1 August - Guy Thys soccer manager
 5 August - Maurice Mollin cyclist

September
 4 September - Lola Bobesco violinist
 8 September - August Vanistendael union leader and politician
 22 September
Maxime Brunfaut architect
Armand Pien weather man and TV presenter

October
 29 October - Albert Cool mayor
 30 October - Antoon Roosens philosopher

November
 11 November - Paul Janssen, founder of Janssen Pharmaceutica

December
 8 December - Charly Talbot politician
 11 December - Ann Petersen actress

See also
2003 in Belgian television

References

 
Years of the 21st century in Belgium
Belgium
2000s in Belgium
Belgium